Bernhard Saarsoo  (8 July 1899 – 29 June 1964) was an Estonian and Swedish physician and botanist.

Saarsoo was born in Aaspere, Haljala Parish in the former Russian Empire. He published a number of notable papers on his studies in the 1930s including Uus robiheinaliik Eestis (1933) and Floristilisi märkmeid IV (1938).

He lived and worked in exile in Växjö, Sweden beginning in 1944 when he fled from the Soviet invasion and occupation of Estonia.

References

External links
 Article in journal Eesti Loodus 

1890s births
1969 deaths
People from Haljala Parish
People from Kreis Wierland
20th-century Estonian botanists
20th-century Estonian physicians
20th-century Swedish physicians
Estonian World War II refugees
Estonian emigrants to Sweden
20th-century Swedish botanists